James Lemont was a member of the Wisconsin State Assembly during the 1885 session, representing the 12th District of Milwaukee County, Wisconsin. He was a Republican. Lemont was born near what was then Bangor, Ireland on December 10, 1843.

References

Irish emigrants to the United States (before 1923)
People from Milwaukee County, Wisconsin
1843 births
Year of death missing
Republican Party members of the Wisconsin State Assembly